Mishmi may refer to:

 Mishmi Hills, between China and India
 Mishmi people, of Tibet and Arunachal Pradesh
 Miju Mishmi tribe, one group of the Mishmi people
 Mishmic languages
 Digaro Mishmi language
 Idu Mishmi language
 Miju-Mishmi language

See also
 All Idu Mishmi Students Union
 Mishmi Garra (Garra rupecula), a species of ray-finned fish
 Mishmi takin, an endangered goat-antelope native to India, Myanmar and the People's Republic of China
 

Language and nationality disambiguation pages